Mel Tormé and the Marty Paich Dektette – Reunion is a 1988 album by the American jazz singer Mel Tormé, accompanied by a big band arranged and led by Marty Paich. It was recorded over three days at Ocean Way Studios, on Sunset at Gower in Hollywood. Alan Sides served as engineer, and Charles Barber as assistant to Marty Paich.

Track listing
"Sweet Georgia Brown" (Ben Bernie, Kenneth Casey, Maceo Pinkard) - 3:05
"When You Wish upon a Star"/"I'm Wishing" (Leigh Harline, Ned Washington) - 2:51
"Walk Between the Raindrops" (Donald Fagen) - 5:44
"The Blues" (Duke Ellington) - 5:18
"The Gift"/"One Note Samba"/"How Insensitive" (Antônio Carlos Jobim)/(Jobim, Newton Mendonça)/(Jobim, Norman Gimbel, Vinícius de Moraes) - 4:54
"The Trolley Song"/"Get Me to the Church on Time" (Ralph Blane, Hugh Martin)/(Alan Jay Lerner, Frederick Loewe) - 4:45
"More Than You Know" (Edward Eliscu, Billy Rose, Vincent Youmans) - 5:48
"Goodbye Look" (Donald Fagen) - 4:45
"For Whom the Bell Tolls"/"Spain (I Can Recall)" (Chick Corea, Al Jarreau, Artie Maren)/(Joaquín Rodrigo, Victor Young) - 6:42

Personnel 
 Mel Tormé - vocals, drums
 Warren Luening - trumpet
 Jack Sheldon - trumpet
 Dan Barrett - trombone
 Chuck Berghofer - double bass
 Bob Efford - baritone saxophone
 Bob Enevoldsen - valve trombone
 Allen Farnham - piano
 Gary Foster - alto saxophone
 Marty Paich - arranger, conductor
 Ken Peplowski - clarinet, tenor saxophone
 Jim Self - tuba
 John Von Ohlen - drums

References

1988 albums
Concord Records albums
Mel Tormé albums
Albums arranged by Marty Paich
Albums produced by Carl Jefferson